Dzhamal Sultanovich Otarsultanov (born 14 April 1987 in Khasavyurtovsky District, Dagestan, Russia) is a male Chechen-Russian wrestler of Chechen heritage, who won the gold medal in men's freestyle 55 kg at the 2012 London Olympics.

References

External links 
Dzhamal Otarsultanov FILA Profile

1987 births
Living people
People from Khasavyurtovsky District
Olympic gold medalists for Russia
Wrestlers at the 2012 Summer Olympics
Olympic wrestlers of Russia
Chechen martial artists
Russian people of Chechen descent
Olympic medalists in wrestling
Chechen sportsmen
Medalists at the 2012 Summer Olympics
Russian male sport wrestlers
Sportspeople from Dagestan